Troy Franklin O'Leary (born August 4, 1969) is an American former professional baseball outfielder who played with the Milwaukee Brewers (-), Boston Red Sox (-), Montreal Expos and Chicago Cubs. He batted and threw left-handed.

In an 11-season career, O'Leary posted a .274 batting average with 127 home runs and 591 runs batted in in 1198 games.

Career
O'Leary attended Cypress High School in Cypress, California. He initially committed to play college football at Oregon State as a wide receiver.

O'Leary had batted over .330 twice before. He was promoted to Milwaukee a year later, and after two seasons, he was selected off waivers by the Red Sox.

O'Leary hit his first career home run September 1, 1994 off San Diego Padres reliever Adam Clark.

O'Leary hit .308 in his first season with the Boston Red Sox and was named the 1995 Red Sox Rookie of the Year. O'Leary collected at least 70 RBI from - and reached double digit home run totals in all 7 seasons with the Red Sox.

Troy enjoyed the best year of his career statistically in 1999. He led the Red Sox with 28 home runs in the regular season, was second on the team to Nomar Garciaparra in RBI (103), and finished with a .280 batting average. He played in 157 of the 162 regular season games and finished with 596 at bats, leading the team in both categories. Troy also posted 84 runs (3rd on team), 167 hits (3rd on team), 36 doubles (4th on team), and a .495 slugging percentage (3rd on team).

One of the greatest performances of O'Leary's career and in Boston Red Sox postseason history took place on October 11, 1999 in the decisive game 5 of the 1999 American League Division Series versus the Cleveland Indians. Boston entered the top half of the third inning trailing 5-2. With runners on second and third and first base open, Indians manager Mike Hargrove chose to intentionally walk Nomar Garciaparra, who had homered in the first inning, to load the bases for O'Leary. O'Leary responded by sending a Charles Nagy breaking ball 417 feet over the right field fence for the first grand slam in Red Sox post-season history, giving Boston a 7-5 lead. When the seventh inning began, the game was tied 8-8. Again, Hargrove chose to intentionally walk Garciaparra to get to O'Leary, this time with Paul Shuey on the mound. O'Leary responded by again jumping on the first pitch he saw, crushing a line drive over the right field fence for a 3 run home-run. O'Leary's 7 RBI, along with 6 no-hit relief innings from Pedro Martinez, helped seal the victory and advanced the Red Sox to the 1999 American League Championship Series against the New York Yankees.

O'Leary would spend 2 more seasons with the Boston Red Sox until the signing of slugger Manny Ramirez made O'Leary expendable. Troy went on to play 97 games for the Montreal Expos in 2002 and 93 games for the Chicago Cubs in 2003. In what turned out to be the final at-bat of his major league career during game 7 of the 2003 National League Championship Series, O'Leary hit a pinch hit home run in the bottom of the 7th inning off of Josh Beckett. 

O'Leary spent 2004 with the Samsung Lions of the Korea Baseball Organization.

In 1198 games over 11 major league seasons, O'Leary posted a .274 batting average (1100-for-4010) with 547 runs, 234 doubles, 40 triples, 127 home runs, 591 RBI, 334 bases on balls, .332 on-base percentage and .448 slugging percentage. He finished his career with a .985 fielding percentage playing at all three outfield positions. In 18 postseason games, he batted .217 (13-for-60) with 7 runs, 3 doubles, 3 home runs, 9 RBI and 5 walks.

References

Dose of reality from O'Leary

External links
, or Retrosheet, or Pelota Binaria (Venezuelan Winter League)

1969 births
Living people
African-American baseball players
American expatriate baseball players in Canada
American expatriate baseball players in Mexico
American expatriate baseball players in South Korea
Baseball players from California
Beloit Brewers players
Boston Red Sox players
Cardenales de Lara players
American expatriate baseball players in Venezuela
Chicago Cubs players
El Paso Diablos players
Gulf Coast Red Sox players
Helena Brewers players
KBO League outfielders
Langosteros de Cancún players
Major League Baseball left fielders
Major League Baseball right fielders
Milwaukee Brewers players
Montreal Expos players
New Orleans Zephyrs players
Ottawa Lynx players
Samsung Lions players
Sportspeople from Compton, California
Stockton Ports players
American expatriate baseball players in Australia
21st-century African-American people
20th-century African-American sportspeople